Diplomatic relations between Egypt and Israel were established on February 26, 1980, after the signing of the Egypt–Israel peace treaty on March 26, 1979. From the year 1982 to 1988, and from 2001 to 2005, there was no Egyptian ambassador to Israel.

List of ambassadors

See also
 List of ambassadors of Israel to Egypt

References

 
Egypt
Israel